Ukonkivi ("Ukko's rock") is located on the island of Ukonsaari in lake Inari, Finnish Lapland. The Inari Sami name for the island is Äijih. The area of the lake is called Ukonselkä. Ukonkivi was considered by the local Inari Sami to be an extremely important siedi, or sacred natural formation, and was used as a sacrificial site, perhaps as recently as in the 19th century.  The names "Ukko" and "Äijih" refer to sky deities in the Finnish and Sami mythologies, respectively.

There are guided tours to the site during the summer from the harbour of the Sami museum, Siida.

There are two known siedis at Ukonsaari. The first one to be studied was a sacrificial cave. One of the most important archaeological findings in Lapland was made at Ukonkivi in 1873 by the British archaeologist Sir Arthur Evans, when a silver jewellery fragment was found in the cave. An additional siedi was discovered in 2007 by Finnish archaeologists.

The names of some of the numerous islands adjacent to Ukonsaari may suggest other religious sites, for example:

 Palo Ukko (Finnish: Fire-Ukko)
 Pikku Ukko (Little Ukko)
 Ukonkarit (Ukko's skerries, a series of islets close to Ukonsaari)
 Hautuumaasaari (Burial ground island)
 Aviosaaret (Marriage islands)
 Tissikivisaari (Breast-stone island)
 Junttisaari (Juntti is a complex word approximately meaning a jokel or hillbilly.)
 Vanha hautuumaasaari (Old burial ground island)
 Ristisalmensaaret (Cross sound islands)

See also 
Ukko
Horagalles
Tiermes
Sami religion

References

Further reading 
 (Dead link, March 1st, 2021)
Some archeological sites of Finland(Dead link, March 1st, 2021)
Picture of Ukonsaari(Dead link, March 1st, 2021)

Archaeological sites in Finland
Lake islands of Finland
Prehistory of the Arctic
Landforms of Lapland (Finland)
History of Lapland (Finland)
Inari, Finland